The Story of Minglan is a 2018 Chinese television series adapted from an eponymous novel written under the pseudonym Guanxin Zeluan. It stars Zhao Liying, Feng Shaofeng and Zhu Yilong. The series premiered on December 25, 2018, on Hunan TV.

Background 
Set in the Northern Song dynasty, the story revolves around Sheng Minglan, the unfavored daughter of an official. After being mistreated by her legal mother and bullied by her half-sisters, Minglan learns to hide her skills and true intentions. She meets Gu Tingye as a child, although she initially has feelings for Qi Heng, the only son of the Duke of Qi. Eventually, Gu Tingye becomes a powerful official and successfully makes Minglan his wife. She helps him guard against his unpleasant relatives, purges the court of corrupt ministers and ultimately succeeds in avenging her biological mother's death. The couple eventually earned their happily-ever-after, and Minglan rises to prominence as an influential figure of the Sheng family.

Plot 
Sheng Hong, a fifth rank official, is head of the Sheng household, and he has one official wife, two concubines, and six children. His official wife is Wang Ruofu, a bad tempered but kind lady who is always at odds with Sheng Hong's favorite concubine, Lin Qinshuang. Lin Qinshuang, a former servant, pretends to act weak and sympathetic, gaining the pity and attention of Sheng Hong, to Wang Ruofu's dismay. Sheng Hong also has a stepmother, Old Mrs. Sheng, who is the only daughter of the Marquis of Yongyi and is respected by her fellow nobles. However, her relationship with Sheng Hong is strained because she dislikes how Sheng Hong isn't able to control Lin Qinshuang's tactics.

Sheng Minglan is the sixth daughter of Sheng Hong and was born to his second concubine, Wei Shuyi. Although she is bright and intelligent, she hid her talents after witnessing her pregnant mother die as a result of Minglan standing up for her. She was raised by Old Mrs. Sheng, who dotes and loves her dearly. She has five other siblings, Hualan, Changbai, Changfeng, Molan, and Rulan. Hualan, Changbai, and Rulan are the children of Wang Ruofu and Changfeng and Molan are the children of Lin Qinshuang, and the children inherited their mother's personalities and dislikes. Hualan is the respected eldest daughter but is domineered by her mother in law. Changbai is a wise scholar and is Gu Tingye's close friend. Changfeng is carefree and wants a higher social standing. Rulan is short tempered but easy-going while Molan is scheming and wants to improve her social status through marriage. The children study and grow up together along with Qi Heng, Gu Tingye, and Yu Yanran.

Meanwhile, Molan is desperate to marry into a rich household to suppress her feelings of inferiority as the daughter of a concubine. Lin Qinshuang helps her daughter, and Molan flirts with Liang Han, the son of the Count of Yongchang. Liang Han's mother, Lady Wu, prefers Minglan as a daughter in law and despises Molan. Molan eventually uses an underhanded method to marry into the Liang household, to the shame of her father, her siblings, and her grandmother. As a result, Lin Qinshuang is beaten and reveals that she didn't have feelings for Sheng Hong. She is sent away, and Minglan reveals to Lin Qinshuang that Molan's marriage was revenge for Wei Shuyi's death. Molan eventually suffers in her marriage as Liang Han has a lot of concubines, especially favoring his maid Chun Ke. Rulan is simple and only wishes to find true happiness. She shares the characteristics of her mother and despises Molan and Lin Qinshuang. She has an amiable relationship with Minglan. Her mother Wang Ruofu wants her to marry into a noble family to compete with Lin Qinshuang. Rulan instead falls in love with her father's student, who also happens to be Molan's fiancee until the Liang Han incident. She eventually marries the scholar, who also loves her back and treats her well.

On the other hand, Qi Heng develops feelings for Minglan. Qi Heng is the only son of the Duke of Qi and the Princess of Pingning. He is well respected coming from an affluent family, and is considered a suitable husband by many households. Molan and the Princess of Jiacheng are interested in marrying him, but he only likes Minglan. She also develops feelings for him, but Qi Heng never understands her feelings through his idealized view of her. Qi Heng is eventually forced to marry the Princess of Jiacheng. However, their marriage doesn't last long because of a rebellion against the Emperor. His wife and her family were executed, and his mother the Princess of Pingning witnesses the tragedy and becomes mentally ill. Gu Tingye is rewarded for saving the Emperor, and he returns to the Gu Household with honors. He is the son of the Marquis of Ningyuan, but he has a poor relationship with his father and his stepmother Lady Qin despises him. His father was forced by his family to marry his mother Lady Bai for her wealth, and Lady Bai died of grief after finding out the truth. Gu Tingye also has a horrible reputation, fathering two children with his mistress Zhu Manniang. Zhu Manniang eventually leaves him when she believes he's of no worth, and Gu Tingye also has to deal with the constant scheming of Lady Qin. Lady Qin wants her son Tingwei to be the next Marquis, although Tingwei clearly objects.

Gu Tingye proposes to Sheng Minglan after being impressed by her, and although she refuses at first, she agrees after realizing he's changed his old habits. Minglan becomes the lady of the Gu household, and she has to deal with the schemes of Lady Qin, Gu relatives, Wang Ruoyu (Wang Ruofu's older sister and lady of the Kang household), Zhu Manniang, and the imperial household (Emperor, Empress Dowager, Consorts). She strengthens her relationship with her siblings, father, and stepmother Wang Ruofu, and helps other nobles find success in their respective families. She goes through various life experiences with Gu TingYe by learning to rely on one another and eventually coming to terms with her true feelings.

Differences from the Novel

(Incomplete)

In the novel, the protagonist is a 21st century woman who died and whose consciousness entered the body of a fever-ridden, five year old Minglan. She uses almost none of her knowledge from the 21st century though and strives to not stand out, so the actual events which take place aren't really affected.

Rulan is haughty and arrogant. Once she grows up, she has a reasonably amicable relationship with Minglan, but only because Minglan goes out of her way to be accommodating. Minglan does not actually like Rulan's company all that much.

Minglan's father is vacillating when it comes to settling the competition between his wife and his favorite concubine, but he is reasonable and fair towards his children. Minglan's premarital life is mostly peaceful and she does not suffer much bullying.

There is no love triangle with Qi Heng. He did want to marry Minglan but he tells almost no-one except his parents. As opposed to the drama, Qi Heng’s mother does not despise Minglan although she doesn’t find Minglan fit to be Qi Heng’s legal wife. His parents suggested that Qi Heng takes Minglan as a concubine instead which Qi Heng rejects and ends up marrying a princess at the behest of his parents. Neither Minglan nor the public knew of his intentions, and the matter is almost never brought up again, after Minglan is betrothed to her childhood acquaintance, and then married to Tingye.

Gu Tingye initially sought to marry Minglan's friend, but Minglan interfered with this matter and Gu Tingye eventually married Minglan's friend's sister who was born from a concubine. At that time, he was already in a relationship with, and had children with, Zhu Manniang. Minglan warns Gu Tingye that Manniang is a power hungry gold digger putting on an act, points out some flaws in her reasoning, and predicts a series of events which all come true. Following the death of Minglan's friend's sister, Gu Tingye performs an investigation and eventually decides to expel Manniang. She and her children are sent away and never heard from again.

Gu Tingye uses a scheme to marry Minglan and is the mastermind behind that series of events. He fell for Minglan after numerous interactions with her and slightly seeing through her facade of being an ordinary, obedient girl. However, he doesn't ask her parents for her hand in marriage because he knows Old Madam Sheng will definitely object, as she wants Minglan to have a happy marriage and does not care if Minglan's marital family lacks high power and status. Instead, he proposes a marriage to the Sheng house after finding out Rulan was in love with a scholar. Since he was of extremely high status, Minglan's family readily agrees to marry "One of the Sheng daughters" to him. He then makes a show of discovering Rulan's relationship with the scholar, making Minglan the only "Sheng daughter" who can be married to him. Even then, he still has to meet with Minglan in private to convince her to convince her grandma to allow the marriage to go ahead instead of defaulting on the agreement. Minglan does not believe she will be as happy married to Tingye as she will be if married to her original intended partner, but she believes it will be tolerable and makes the sacrifice for the sake of her family.

Gu Tingye keeps his word and basically gives Minglan a free pass to break all social norms and be as rude as she likes to Gu Tingye's relatives and to be as tyrannical as she wants to her servants. Minglan, however, chooses to maintain the image of an virtuous, traditional wife who manages things using the proper methods.

Minglan's opponents in the novel are not nearly as violent or confrontational in general. Many of them are leeches trying to obtain benefits from Minglan, either directly or through her proximity to Gu Tingye, and Minglan carefully thwarts their attempts while maintaining social etiquette and decorum. Very few directly attack Minglan's reputation directly, and none of them attempt to use means like murder and such.

Cast

Main

Supporting

Sheng household (Minglan's Childhood Home)

Kaifeng

Youyang

Gu household

Cheng garden (Gu Tengye and Sheng Minglan's marital home)

Ningyuan manor (Gu Tingye's Childhood Home)

Bai household

Qi household

He household

Yuan household

Yu household

Liang household

Wang household

Kang household

Imperial household

Shen household

Zhang household

Imperial court

Other

Production

Crew
The series is produced by Hou Hong Liang and Daylight Entertainment, who has produced several hit television series like Nirvana in Fire and Ode to Joy. It is directed by Zhang Kaizhou of Love Me If You Dare and Ode to Joy 2. The screenplay of the series is written by Zeng Lu and Wu Tong, who were both co-writers of Battle of Changsha.

Casting and shooting 
Pre-production started in April 2017. On May 8, 2017, Zhao Liying was announced to play the leading role of Sheng Minglan. Feng Shaofeng was unveiled as the male lead on June 20, 2017. The rest of the supporting cast was announced in August 2017. Filming began in September 2017 at Hengdian World Studios. The series wrapped up filming in April 2018.

Soundtrack

Reception
The show has an 8.1 out of 10 on Douban and received mainly positive reviews. It has become a major trending topic on social media, with related hashtags being viewed hundreds of millions of times. Many netizens have praised the television series for revealing problems and contradictions in real life, such as traditional Chinese families' preference for boys over girls, NEET, and generational conflicts when it comes to providing care for the elderly.

Ratings 

 Highest ratings are marked in red, lowest ratings are marked in blue

Awards and nominations

References

External links

Television series set in the Northern Song
Chinese historical television series
2018 Chinese television series debuts
Hunan Television dramas
Television series by Daylight Entertainment
Television shows based on Chinese novels
Television shows set in Kaifeng